Revry (Revry.tv) is a global streaming network launched in 2016 that focuses on queer content and creators. It was founded by Damian Pelliccione, Alia J. Daniels, Christopher Rodriguez, Wadooah Wali and LaShawn McGhee. The website offers a curated selection of films, series, podcasts, music, and videos. Additionally, Revry releases original content, including the series Gayborhood, Before I Got Famous, and Drag Roast, as well as numerous podcasts. Its content is available online and via services including iOS, Apple TV, Amazon Fire, Android TV, Roku, and TiVo. 

In addition to its LGBTQ themes, Revry promotes content inclusive of racial and ethnic diversity. In 2019, founder Rodriguez said, "I think a driving force behind our programming is reflecting the community as we are as opposed to what's trendy or what big-wig execs think is marketable."

Revry's company headquarters are in Los Angeles, California.

References

Transactional video on demand
American companies established in 2015
LGBT-related websites